The women's heptathlon event at the 2002 Asian Athletics Championships was held in Colombo, Sri Lanka on 9–10 August.

Results

References

2002 Asian Athletics Championships
Combined events at the Asian Athletics Championships
2002 in women's athletics